Zaozerne is an urban-type settlement in the Yevpatoria municipality of the Autonomous Republic of Crimea, a territory recognized by a majority of countries as part of Ukraine and incorporated by Russia as the Republic of Crimea. Population:  4,161 as of the 2001 Ukrainian Census, and 4,940 in 2011.

Until 1948, the settlement was known by its native Crimean tatar name Yaly-Moinak. Its current name is a literally translated as "beyond the lake." It was granted the status of an urban-type settlement in 1973.

References

Yevpatoria Municipality
Urban-type settlements in Crimea